Sympathy for the Devil is a 2019 war drama film directed by Guillaume de Fontenay and released in 2019. Based on the book of the same name by French war correspondent Paul Marchand, the film stars Niels Schneider as Marchand covering the Bosnian War in the 1990s.

The cast also includes Vincent Rottiers and Ella Rumpf.

The film, a coproduction of companies from Canada, France and Belgium, had its Canadian theatrical premiere at the Cinemania film festival on November 11, 2019, before premiering commercially on November 29.

Cast 
 Niels Schneider as Paul Marchand
 Ella Rumpf as Boba
 Vincent Rottiers as Vincent
 Clément Métayer as Philippe
 Arieh Worthalter as Ken Doyle
 Elisa Lasowski as Louise Baker
 Diego Martín as Luis

Accolades

References

External links
 

2019 films
Belgian war drama films
Canadian war drama films
French war drama films
Quebec films
Bosnian War films
Films based on non-fiction books
2019 war drama films
2010s French-language films
French-language Belgian films
French-language Canadian films
2010s Canadian films
2010s French films